"Messin' Around" is a 1948 song by Memphis Slim and His House Rockers, released as Miracle Records 125. It was Slim's first and only R&B chart No.1, spending two weeks at the top of the chart from September 4, 1948.

References

 

1948 songs
Memphis Slim songs
Song articles with missing songwriters